Quantum orbital motion involves the quantum mechanical motion of rigid particles (such as electrons) about some other mass, or about themselves. Typically, orbital motion in classical motion is characterized by orbital angular momentum (the orbital motion of the center of mass) and spin, which is the motion about the center of mass. In quantum mechanics, there are analogous forms of spin and angular momentum, however they differ fundamentally from the models of classical bodies. For example, an electron (one of the main particles of concern in quantum mechanics) exhibits very quantum mechanical behavior in its motion around the nucleus of an atom which cannot be explained by classical mechanics.

Orbital Angular Momentum

When quantum mechanics refers to the orbital angular momentum of an electron, it is generally referring to the spatial wave equation that represents the electron's motion around the nucleus of an atom. Electrons do not "orbit" the nucleus in the classical sense of angular momentum, however the mathematical representation of L = r × p still leads to the quantum mechanical version of angular momentum. Just as in classical mechanics, the law of conservation of angular momentum still holds.

Spin

An electron has no charge distribution, and is therefore considered a point charge. It does however produce a magnetic dipole that can be oriented in an external magnetic field, as with magnetic resonance. There is also a so-called "current loop" that is created by the motion of the charged electron, despite its lack of any apparent volume which is required classically for such a current loop to exist. It also contributes to the total angular momentum the particle has, which is a sum of both the angular momentum and spin.

A particle's spin is generally represented in terms of spin operators. It turns out for particles that make up ordinary matter (protons, neutrons, electrons, quarks, etc.) particles are of spin 1/2, meaning that only two eigenvectors of the Hamiltonian exist for a spin 1/2 state, implying that there are only two values of energy that can be measured.  Thus showing that the inherent quantum property of energy quantization is a direct result of electron spin.

See also
Atomic orbital
Electron orbital
Electron
Lorentz-violating neutrino oscillations
Orbital magnetization

References

External links
Primer on Quantum Theory of the Atom
 MadSci.org explanation

Magnetism